Honeycomb is a 1969 Spanish drama film directed by Carlos Saura. The film stars Geraldine Chaplin and Per Oscarsson as a complicated married couple. It was entered into the 19th Berlin International Film Festival.

Plot
Shortly after Teresa (Chaplin) sets fire to her husband's hair, the antagonized and reserved businessman agrees to participate in his pretty young wife's personality games. Teresa soon fills their contemporary home with family heirlooms she retrieved from the basement, and a sense of isolation takes over the house as the couple lock the doors and draw the shades away from the prying eyes of neighbours. However, all too soon these games reach a feverish intensity and fantasy soon blurs into reality.

Cast
 Geraldine Chaplin as Teresa
 Per Oscarsson as Pedro
 Teresa del Río as Carmen
 Julia Peña as Águeda
 Emiliano Redondo as Antonio
 María Elena Flores as Rosa
 Gloria Berrocal as La Tía

References

External links
 

1969 films
1960s Spanish-language films
1969 drama films
Films directed by Carlos Saura
Films with screenplays by Rafael Azcona
Spanish drama films
1960s Spanish films